The rulers of Aleppo ruled as kings, emirs and sultans of the city and its surrounding region since the later half of the 3rd millennium BC, starting with the kings of Armi, followed by the Amorite dynasty of Yamhad. Muslim rule of the city ended with the Ayyubid dynasty which was ousted by the Mongol conquest in 1260.

The rulers of Yamhad used the titles of king and Great King, while the Hittite dynasty monarchs used the titles of king and viceroy.

The Emirate of Halab was established in 945 by the Hamdanid dynasty and lasted until 1086, when it became a sultanate under the Seljuq dynasty.  The sultanate was sometimes ruled together with Damascus under the same sultan.

The Artuqids rulers used the titles of Malik and emir, as did the Zengid rulers which added the title atabeg.  The Ayyubid monarchs used the titles of sultan and malik.

The dates for Yamhad and the Hittite Dynasties are proximate and calculated by the Middle chronology.

Yamhad Dynasty

Yamhad was the name of the Amorite kingdom centered at Ḥalab (modern day Aleppo), its dynasty ruled for more than two centuries, Aleppo became a major power and dominated Northern Syria with the monarch holding the title of Great King.

Aleppo was conquered by Mursili I King of the Hittites, who captured Hammurabi III, the dynasty regained Halab after the assassination of Mursili but the "Yamhad" name fell out of use.

Hittite Dynasty
Parshatatar of Mitanni conquered Aleppo, and the city became part of that kingdom until conquered by Suppiluliuma I of the Hittites in the 14th century BC. Suppiluliuma installed his son Telipinus as king of Aleppo. Not all the kings of this dynasty are known. The Hittite dynasty remained in power until the Late Bronze Age collapse.

After the end of the Hittites, Arameans tribes began to settle in the region, Aleppo became part of the Syro-Hittite state of Palistin, then its successor Bit Agusi centered at Arpad, Afterwards, it was sequentially part of Assyria, Chaldea, Achaemenid Persia, Macedonia, Seleúkeia, Armenia, Roman, Byzantine, and Sasanid Persian, empires, the Rashidun, Umayyad, and the Abbasid Caliphate.

Hamdanid Dynasty

The Hamdanids were an Arab dynasty, established in 945 by Sayf al-Dawla, third of the dynasty. They ruled most of Syria, displacing the Ikhshids, with Aleppo as their capital, under the titular authority of the Abbasid Caliph.

Non-dynastic
Qarghuyah, the chamberlain of Sayf al-Dawla, ousted Sa'd al-Dawla and assumed control over the city.  Sa'd al-Dawla was able to regain Aleppo in 977.

Hamdanid Dynasty restored

Lu'lu' Dynasty
Lu'lu' al-Kabir was a slave and then chamberlain of Sa'd al-Dawla.  He married his daughter to Sa'id al-Dawla, and after the latter's death, he assumed direct power over Aleppo.  At first, he served as guardians to Sa'id al-Dawla's sons Abu'l-Hasan Ali and Abu'l-Ma'ali Sharif.  In 1004, he had them exiled to Egypt and assumed full control of the city.

Non-dynastic
In 1016, a rebellion broke out in the city and Fath al-Qal'i, custodian of the Citadel of Aleppo, opened the doors for the rebels causing Mansur to flee.  Fath accepted the authority of the Fatimid Caliph and, after a brief rule, ceded Aleppo to the caliph in return for the treasury and the rule of Tyre.

Fatimid Caliphate
Al-Hakim appointed Aziz al-Dawla as the first Fatimid governor of Aleppo, but in 1020, Aziz declared his independence, and ruled for two years before being assassinated by a Fatimid agent.

Mirdasid Dynasty

The Mirdasids conquered Aleppo in 1024 and kept their autonomy through political maneuvers, allying themselves with the Byzantines at times and the Fatimid at others.

After the death of Salih, his sons Nasr and Thimal ruled together.  In 1030, Nasr deposed Thimal and ruled solely until killed by Anushtakin al-Dizbari, the Fatimid governor of Damascus. Thimal regained Aleppo briefly in 1038 when the Fatimid army retook the city, returning it to Fatimid rule.

Non-dynastic
In December 1041 Anushtakin al-Dizbari fell out of favor with Cairo and declared his independence in Aleppo.  He died of illness in 1042 and Thimal returned to power.

Mirdasid Dynasty
Thimal regained Aleppo and accepted the authority of the Fatimid Caliph.

Non-dynastic
In 1057, fearing family intrigues, Thimal handed over Aleppo to the Fatimids in return for Acre, Byblos and Beirut, thus returning Aleppo to direct Fatimid control.

Mirdasid dynasty
In 1060, Thimal's nephew, Rashid al-Dawla Mahmud, the son of Shibl al-Dawla Nasr, briefly regained Aleppo, losing after a few months to the Fatimids.

About three weeks later on 30 August 1060 Asad al-Dawla 'Atiyya son of Salih the founder of the dynasty occupied Aleppo for a day and a half then fled as Mu'izz al-Dawla Mahmud advanced on the city after defeating the Fatimid army.

Uqaylid Dynasty

The pressure of Tutush I led the people of Aleppo along with the Mirdasid Emir to offer the city keys to Sharaf al-Dawla Muslim the ruler of Mosul, the Mirdasid family members were compensated by various towns in Syria.

Sharaf al-Dawla was killed in June 1085 and was succeeded by his brother Ibrahim ibn Quraysh in Mosul, while Aleppo was managed by the Sharif Hassan ibn Hibat Allah Al-Hutayti.

Seljuk Dynasty

Hassan ibn Hibat Allah Al-Hutayti promised to surrender the city to Tutush but then refused and wrote to Sultan Malik-Shah I offering to surrender the city to him, Tutush attacked and occupied the city except for the citadel in May 1086, he stayed until October and left for Damascus due to the advance of Malik-Shah armies, the Sultan himself arrived in December 1086.

After the death of Malik-Shah I, his governor Aq Sunqur al-Hajib enjoyed much autonomy.  He pledged allegiance to Malik-Shah's son Mahmud I, and then to Tutush only to switch back to Mahmud's brother Barkiyaruq.  In 1094, Tutush defeated and beheaded Aq Sunqur thus assuming full control over Aleppo.

Artuqid Dynasty

Sultan Shah was only six when he came to the throne, the threats of the Crusader Count Joscelin led Sultan Shah Guardian Ibn al-Khashshab to offer the city to Ilghazi of Mardin who came to Aleppo thus starting the Artuqid dynasty in Aleppo.

Timurtash was occupied with taking over the cities of his recently deceased brother Suleiman I (who usurped the emir of Aleppo briefly in 1120), the crusaders attacked Aleppo but Timurtash refused to come back, this led the people of Aleppo to seek the help of Aqsunqur al-Bursuqi the Seljuq atabeg of Mosul, Aqsunqur broke the crusader siege adding Aleppo to the domains of Seljuq sultan Mahmud II.

In 1127 The city rebelled against the Seljuq governor Khatlagh Abah and restored Suleiman II.

Zengid Dynasty

Imad ad-Din Zengi, the new atabeg of Mosul, sent his army to end the troubles.  He ruled in the name of Seljuq Sultan Mahmud II whose death had led to civil war.  Zengi didn't declare his independence and stood by Ghiyath ad-Din Mas'ud. the Seljuq Sultan of Iraq, ruling in his name.  However, the sultan decided to eliminate Zengi and called upon him to show in his presence.  Zengi was warned and declined to show thus establishing his independence.

Zengi reconciled with the sultan and recognized his authority, but in practice he was independent in all but name.

When Nur ad-Din inherited Aleppo after father's murder, he took the title of King (Malik) and used the title of Emir. Formally, the Zengids were subordinate to the Seljuq Sultans of Iraq, firstly Mas'ud then Malik-Shah III followed by Muhammad II.  Nur al-Din retained the title of atabeg although he was completely independent as the Seljuq empire disintegrated after 1156, and the sultans had to fight in Iraq to keep whats left of their authority.  Muhammad II was the last Sultan to hold any real authority, and he attacked Baghdad aided by Nur al-Din's brother Qutb ad-Din Mawdud.  Muhammad II death in 1159 and the fact that his successor Suleiman-Shah was a captive of Mawdud ended any real authority of the Seljuq Sultans, Nur al-Din Held the Khutbah in the name of the Abbasid Caliph, an enemy of the Seljuqs thus cutting any links with them.

Ayyubid Dynasty

The death of Nur al-Din caused chaos as al-Salih Ismail al-Malik, his son and successor was only eleven.  The Zengid governors fought for power, each one of them trying to be the atabeg of al-Salih. One of them, Gümüshtekin, became the guardian of the young king and tried to eliminate the others causing the governor of Damascus to ask Saladin, the Zengid governor of Egypt, for help. 
Saladin, formally a subordinate to Al-Salih but practically independent, marched on Syria entering Damascus in November 1174.  He besieged Aleppo, causing Al-Salih's cousin Ghazi II the Emir of Mosul to send his army which Saladin defeated at the battle of Tell al-Sultan, Saladin was proclaimed King of Egypt and Syria, the Caliph al-Mustadi conferred the Title of Sultan upon him.

Saladin met al-Salih and concluded a peace with the 13-year old king in 1176 leaving him to rule Aleppo independently for life while he (Saladin) ruled the rest of Syria.

After the death of al-Salih, Saladin expelled al-Salih's relative Zengi II and entered Aleppo on 20 June 1183 thus ending the Zengid Dynasty.

On 24 January 1260 the Mongol Khan Hulagu Khan entered Aleppo after a month of Siege thus ending the Ayyubid Dynasty.

Mamluks
 
The Mamluk Sultan Qutuz defeated the Mongols at Ain Jalut on 3 September 1260, the whole of Syria became part of the Mamluk Sultanate, Aleppo was the capital of its own province ruled by a Na'ib (Naib), some of these governors revolted and declared their independence in Aleppo like Shams al-Din Aqosh al-Borli who installed al-Hakim I as Abbasid Caliph in order to legitimize his reign while the Sultan Baibars I installed al-Mustansir II, other governors revolted with the aim of ruling the whole sultanate such as Yalbogha al-Nasiri who had Sultan Barquq dethroned in 1389.

Aqosh eventually reconciled with the sultan, in 1404 Sayf al-Din Jakam revolted and declared himself Sultan.

Jakam Reoccupied the City and was pardoned and reappointed by the sultan, in May 1406 he was replaced by another Na'ib leading him to revolt again.

See also

 Timeline of Aleppo
State of Aleppo
Rulers of Damascus
List of Emirs of Mosul

References

Citations

 
Aleppo
Syria history-related lists